The Eastern Eyre Football League (EEFL) is an Australian rules football competition based in the Eyre Peninsula region of South Australia. It was formed in 1989 from the merger of the Kimba Districts Football League and the County Jervois Football League.   The league's foundation clubs were Cleve, Cowell, Darke Peak-Waddikee (a merger of Darke Peak & Waddikee), Kimba Districts (a merger of Kimba, Buckleboo & Kelly), Ports (a merger of Arno Bay & Port Neill) and Rudall.

Central Eyre and Wudinna United amalgamated to form Central Eyre United and transferred from the Mid West League before the start of 2021.

It is an affiliated member of the South Australian National Football League.

Current clubs

Former clubs

2009 Ladder 
																	
																	
FINALS

2010 Ladder 
																	
																	
FINALS

2011 Ladder

2012 Ladder

2013 Ladder

2014 Ladder

2015 Ladder

2016 Ladder

2017 Ladder

Notable players
Notable AFL players to have played in the league include Corey Enright (Kimba Districts), Shaun Rehn (Ports), Shane and Darryl Wakelin (Kimba Districts), Brett Chalmers (Rudall), Levi Greenwood (Ports).

Notable coaches include Grant "Puggy" Jenner (Cleve), Ivan "Shorty" Shubert (Darke Peak, Cleve) and Ben "The Hampster" Hampel (Rudall).

Notable personalities of the league include Brian Rhett "Boozer" Morrow of Darke Peak.

Books
 Encyclopedia of South Australian country football clubs, compiled by Peter Lines. 
 South Australian country football digest, by Peter Lines

External links
 EEFL on AFL NAcional

Eyre Peninsula
Australian rules football competitions in South Australia